The LM13700 is an integrated circuit consisting  of two current controlled operational transconductance amplifiers (OTA), each having differential inputs and a push-pull output. The LM13700 is like a standard op-amp: each has a pair of differential inputs and a single output, but an OTA is voltage in and current out rather than voltage in and voltage out; and OTAs are programmable via the IABC pin. Linearizing diodes at the input reduce distortion and allow increased input levels. The darlington output buffers provided are specifically designed to complement the wide dynamic range of the OTA. This chip is very useful in audio electronics especially in analog synthesizer circuits like voltage controlled oscillators, voltage controlled filters, and voltage controlled amplifiers. The darlington output buffers on the LM13700 are different from those on the LM13600 in that their bias currents (and hence their output DC levels) are independent of IABC pin. This usually results in performance superior to that of the LM13600 in audio applications.

See also
 Transconductance
 Operational amplifier
 Transconductance amplifier
 current mirror

References

External links
 A Short Discussion of the Operational Transconductance Amplifier
  The LM13600/LM13700 Story

Linear integrated circuits